Jeffery Justus (born February 18, 1954) is an American politician who served as a member of the Missouri House of Representatives for the 156th district from 2013 to 2021. He is a member of the Republican party.

References

Living people
Republican Party members of the Missouri House of Representatives
1954 births
21st-century American politicians